Lê Gia Tông (黎嘉宗, 1661 – 27 April 1675) was the 20th emperor of Vietnamese Later Lê dynasty.

Biography
Lê Gia Tông's birth name is Lê Duy Cối (黎維禬), courtesy name Duy Định (維礻定). He was born in 1661 and reigned from 19 November 1672 to 3 April 1675. He was a figurehead king under the power of lord Trịnh Tạc who ruled 1657–82.

References

1661 births
1675 deaths
G
Vietnamese monarchs